Alfred Downing Fripp (22 April 1822 – 13 March 1895) was a British artist who specialised in watercolours of rural subjects. He was grandson of the artist Nicholas Pocock,  a brother of the painter George Arthur Fripp, and father of the surgeon Sir Alfred Downing Fripp.

Fripp was born in Bristol and studied at the Royal Academy of Arts. He held his first exhibition in 1842, his initial works featuring Irish and Welsh peasants in landscape settings. In 1844 he became an associate of the Old Watercolour Society, progressing to full membership in 1846, and ultimately becoming its secretary from 1870 onward.

Following the death of his first wife in 1850, he spent a decade in Italy, where he became friends with Frederick Leighton and Edward Poynter. On his return in 1859 he married Eliza Banister Roe and he continued to paint British subjects, with a particular interest in Dorset scenery around Lulworth. Many of Eliza's younger siblings were models for his paintings including "the FIsher Boy". He died, aged 72, in London.

Gallery

References

Francis Greenacre, "Fripp, George Arthur (1813–1896)", Oxford Dictionary of National Biography, Oxford University Press, 2004 accessed 13 June 2007
Obituary, The Times, London, Saturday, 16 March 1895, p. 12

19th-century English painters
English male painters
English watercolourists
Landscape artists
1822 births
1895 deaths
Artists from Bristol
19th-century English male artists